Waldron may refer to:

People
Waldron (surname)
Waldron Fox-Decent (born 1937), Canadian academic and political scientist
Waldron Smithers (1880–1954), British politician
Mal Waldron (1925–2002), American jazz pianist, composer and arranger
Adelbert Waldron (1933–1995), US Army sniper (Vietnam-era; most confirmed kills until 2011)
Jeremy Waldron (born 1953), New Zealand legal and political philosopher
John C. Waldron (1900-1942), American naval pilot who died leading a squadron in the Battle of Midway

Places

United States
 Waldron, Arkansas, a city
 Aroma Park, Illinois, a village formerly known as Waldron
 Waldron, Indiana, an unincorporated community
 Waldron, Kansas, a city
 Waldron, Michigan, a village
 Waldron, Missouri, an unincorporated community
 Waldron, Washington, an unincorporated community also known as Waldron Island
 Waldron Ledge, Hawaii, which overlooks Kīlauea Caldera
 Waldron Shale, Indiana, a geologic formation
 Waldron Trail, a hiking trail on the South Rim of the Grand Canyon in Arizona

Antarctica
 Cape Waldron, Wilkes Land
 Mount Waldron, Ellsworth Mountains, Ellsworth Land
 Waldron Spurs, Ross Dependency
 Waldron Glacier, Wilkes Land

Elsewhere
 Waldron, East Sussex, England
 Waldron, Saskatchewan, Canada, a community
 Waldron Cutting, a geological site in East Sussex, England
 Namotu, an island in Fiji with the dual names of Namotu and Waldron

Other uses
Waldron High School (disambiguation), multiple high schools
Waldron School District, Scott County, Arkansas, United States
The Waldron, NHS building in Lewisham, London, England
 , a US Navy destroyer commissioned in 1944
 The Waldron War, an 1870s conflict in Reconstruction-era Arkansas